A wale is one of the strakes of wooden planking that forms the outer skin of the hull of a ship, but substantially thicker than the other strakes. It provides extra stiffening and strength to the hull. It was a common feature of heavy wooden ship construction, particularly from the Middle Ages to the early years of the 19th century, being a major constructional component of ships like ,  and many earlier vessels.

A wale (or "waler") is a horizontal supporting member of a concrete forming system, vertically reinforced by a "strongback".

A wale is also a horizontal member of a geotechnical tieback wall, which transmits the force from the tieback to the beams.

See also
Strake

References

External links

Shipbuilding